Drymophloeus oliviformis is a species of flowering plant in the family Arecaceae. It is found only in Indonesia (Maluku and Western New Guinea).
It is threatened by habitat loss.

References

oliviformis
Flora of the Maluku Islands
Flora of New Guinea
Data deficient plants
Plants described in 1830
Taxonomy articles created by Polbot